Nymphicula callichromalis is a moth in the family Crambidae. It was described by Paul Mabille in 1879. It is found on Madagascar.

References

Nymphicula
Moths described in 1879